Taghdumbash Pamir ( or historically ) or Taxkorgan Nature Reserve is a pamir or high valley in the south west of Tashkurgan Tajik Autonomous County, in Xinjiang, China.   It lies to the west of the Karakoram Highway.  It is inhabited by Wakhi, Kirghiz and Sarikolis animal herders, who graze yaks and other animals on the grasslands of the pamir.

The name Taghdumbash Pamir is also sometimes applied to the mountain ranges surrounding the pamir, on the borders of Pakistan, Afghanistan, and Tajikistan with China, straddling the Pamir Mountains along the Sarikol Range, the Hindu Kush, the Mustagh mountains, and the Wakhan. The range divides Badakhshan Province in Afghanistan, Gorno-Badakhshan Autonomous Province in Tajikistan, and Gilgit-Baltistan in Pakistan.

During the Qing dynasty, the Chinese claimed suzerainty over the area but permitted the Mir of Hunza to administer the region in return for a tribute. According to British colonial sources, this arrangement started during early Ayosh dynasty of Mir of Hunza, as the Mir conquered the Kirghiz nomads of Taghdumbash Pamir. The Mir erected a cairn in Dafdar to evidence his control. The tribute system continued up until 1937.

In 1984, the pamir and surrounding area was designated Taxkorgan Nature Reserve. Chalachigu Valley, an offshoot of the Taxkorgan Valley is the only place in China where Marco Polo sheep can be found.

References

External links
 Taghdumbash River basin, OpenStreetMap, retrieved 28 January 2023.
 Karachukar River basin, OpenStreetMap, retrieved 28 January 2023.
 

Valleys of Xinjiang
Tashkurgan Tajik Autonomous County